Robert or Bob Ferrier may refer to:

Bob Ferrier (English footballer) (1899–1971), played for Motherwell F.C.
Bob Ferrier (Scottish footballer) (1874–1947), father of the above, played for Sheffield Wednesday F.C.
Robert J. Ferrier (1932–2013), chemist